Menopause is a monthly peer-reviewed medical journal covering all aspects of gynecology dealing with topics related to menopause. It was established in 1994 and is published by Lippincott Williams & Wilkins. The editor-in-chief is Isaac Schiff (Harvard Medical School). It is an official journal of the North American Menopause Society. According to the Journal Citation Reports, the journal has a 2014 impact factor of 3.361.

References

External links 
 

Publications established in 1994
Obstetrics and gynaecology journals
Monthly journals
Lippincott Williams & Wilkins academic journals
English-language journals